Qaleh Now (also Romanized as Qal‘eh Now) is a village in Robat Rural District, in the Central District of Khorramabad County, Lorestan Province, Iran. During the 2006 census, its population was 334, in 68 families.

References 

Towns and villages in Khorramabad County